Hot Springs Village is a census-designated place (CDP) in Garland and Saline counties in the U.S. state of Arkansas. As it is situated in two counties, it is also part of two metropolitan statistical areas.  The portion in Garland County is within the Hot Springs Metropolitan Statistical Area, while the portion extending into Saline County is part of the Little Rock–North Little Rock–Conway Metropolitan Statistical Area. The population was 12,807 at the 2010 census. In land area, it is the largest gated community in the United States.

Geography
Hot Springs Village is located at  (34.664504, -92.996192).

Governance
Hot Springs Village has more than 26,000 acres, much of it wooded. HSV is governed by the HSV Property Owners' Association (POA), a private, tax-exempt property owners association. A general manager and a seven-member volunteer board of directors, who are elected in staggered three-year terms, comprise POA leadership. Day-to-day operation of the POA is handled by an average of 475 employees assigned to one of six departments: Administration, Golf, Planning and Inspection, Public Safety, Public Works, and Recreation.

In addition to the Planning and Inspection Department, HSV's Architectural Control Committee's responsibility is to ensure that all building plans conform to architectural policy and building codes of the Village and to issue permits for new homes, landscaping, and remodeling. The ACC ensures that green belt areas, roadways, lakes, and other common areas are protected for general character, appearance and use by Hot Springs Village property owners.

Hot Springs Village has a Declaration and Covenants and Restrictions with which all property owners must comply. The POA has an information and regulations booklet detailing rules for recreational amenities. All HSV common property and amenities are owned by the property owners as a whole and maintained, regulated and operated by the POA:
 Eleven recreation lakes plus an isolated water-supply lake. The largest, Lake Balboa, is 944 acres.
 Two beaches, two full-service marinas, including boat rentals
 Two lake-side, covered pavilion complexes for group picnics for up to 300 people
 Nine golf courses (some of which are top-rated in Arkansas)
 The only 5-star tennis association in Arkansas (includes 10 clay courts)
 Indoor swimming complex
 Outdoor swimming pool (opened 2020) 
 One of the largest bridge clubs in the United States (listed in the "Top 100 " most active duplicate bridge clubs of the ACBL). 
 Coronado Fitness Center, a large, extensively equipped fitness center
The center's Casa de Carta is home to one of the largest Duplicate Bridge clubs in the U.S., with more than 800 members. Ponce de Leon's Ouachita Activities Building has large and small meeting rooms.
 DeSoto Club Events Center, available for rent by POA members and non-members
 An RV camping park and RV and boat storage areas
 A family recreation area, including miniature golf and indoor/outdoor activities
 Lawn bowling, bocce ball and pickleball courts
 A public-safety department providing police and fire protection
 Four fire stations and an ambulance headquarters
 Animal/wildlife control

The private-membership Diamante Country Club has a golf course and clubhouse. Country club members bought the club from the previous owners, ClubCorp and Cooper Communities Inc., early in 2018.

Demographics

2020

As of the 2020 United States census, there were 15,861 people, 7,279 households, and 5,045 families residing in the CDP.

2010
As of the census of 2010, the CDP's racial demographics were 97.9% white (96.0 non-Hispanic, 1.1% White Hispanic), 1.3% Black or African-American, 0.8% American Indian and Alaska Native, 0.4% Asian, 0.0% Native Hawaiian and Other Pacific Islander, and 0.5 belonging to other races. 1.5 of the CDP's residents were Hispanic of any race.

2000
As of the census of 2000, there were 8,397 people, 4,295 households, and 3,221 families residing in the CDP. The racial makeup of the CDP was 97.98% White, 0.94% Black or African American, 0.14% Native American, 0.19% Asian, 0.20% from other races, and 0.55% from two or more races.  1.01% of the population were Hispanic or Latino of any race.

There were 4,295 households, out of which 6.8% had children under the age of 18 living with them, 71.5% were married couples living together, 2.8% had a female householder with no husband present, and 25.0% were non-families. 23.1% of all households were made up of individuals, and 18.4% had someone living alone who was 65 years of age or older.  The average household size was 1.94 and the average family size was 2.22. In the CDP, the population was spread out, with 6.6% under the age of 18, 1.7% from 18 to 24, 8.0% from 25 to 44, 27.2% from 45 to 64, and 56.6% who were 65 years of age or older.  The median age was 67 years. For every 100 females, there were 88.5 males.  For every 100 females age 18 and over, there were 87.6 males.

The median income for a household in the CDP was $41,875, and the median income for a family was $48,958. Males had a median income of $35,236 versus $20,313 for females. The per capita income for the CDP was $24,492.  About 1.6% of families and 2.5% of the population were below the poverty line, including 5.6% of those under age 18 and 1.9% of those age 65 or over.

A weekly local newspaper, the Hot Springs Village Voice, is delivered every Tuesday.

Crime
According to neighborhoodscout.com, the CDP has a crime rate of 4 crimes per square mile, significantly lower than the Arkansas average of 21 crimes per square mile. The organization had also determined that the risk of becoming a victim in Hot Springs Village was 1 in 81 compared to the state average of 1 in 28.

Education
Much of Hot Springs Village is in the Fountain Lake School District, while portions are in the Jessieville School District. The former operates Fountain Lake High School.

Climate/weather
Hot Springs Village ("HSV") has four distinct seasons. Winter freezes usually begin in mid November and may occur into April. Temperatures over 100 degrees may start as early as June and may occur into September. Typically, the area will see several days of snow during the winter and minimum temperatures of 15 degrees or higher. Rainfall is usually plentiful in spring and sparse in summer.

References

External links
 Aerial map of Hot Springs Village with features marked and other information about HSV

Census-designated places in Arkansas
Census-designated places in Garland County, Arkansas
Census-designated places in Saline County, Arkansas
Gated communities in Arkansas
Census-designated places in Little Rock–North Little Rock–Conway metropolitan area

Populated places established in 1970